The Indira Gandhi Memorial is a museum established to commemorate India's first and the only female Prime Minister Indira Gandhi. It is housed in the building where Gandhi lived with her family during her premiership and where she was assassinated. The museum contains material remains of Gandhi and her son Rajiv Gandhi.

References 

Indira Gandhi
Museums in India